Mike Sparks (born January 11, 1967) is a Republican member of the Tennessee House of Representatives representing District 49.

Career
Sparks was a county commissioner for Rutherford County, Tennessee from 2002 until 2010. Sparks has served on the Smyrna Municipal Planning Committee for 9 years. Sparks has authored three books including Learn The Car Business for Fun & Profit, Learn to Barter & 21 Ways to Increase Your Income and his latest How to Do More with Less During Tough Times.

Personal life
Sparks is married to his wife Felicia of 31 years and they have two sons. Sparks is a graduate of Smyrna High School, attended Thurman Francis School, Smyrna Middle School, Smyrna West, and David Youree Elementary. His mother is from Edinburgh, Scotland and is father was from Okmulgee, Oklahoma. Sparks' late father was stationed at Sewart Air Force Base which is now much of Smyrna Airport.

References

External links
Official page at the Tennessee General Assembly
Campaign site

Mike Sparks at Ballotpedia

Place of birth missing (living people)
1967 births
Living people
Republican Party members of the Tennessee House of Representatives
Middle Tennessee State University alumni
People from Smyrna, Tennessee
21st-century American politicians